= 1895 in basketball =

The following are the basketball events of the year 1895 throughout the world.

== Events ==
- January – Drexel University faced Temple University in the schools first organized games. Drexel beat temple by a score of 26–1.
- February 9 – The first recorded game between two American college teams occurred, when Hamline University faced Minnesota A&M (which later became a part of the University of Minnesota). Minnesota A&M won the game, which was played under rules allowing nine players per side, 9–3.
